The Church of St. Mary and All Saints, Bingham, is the parish church of Bingham in the Rushcliffe borough of Nottinghamshire, England. The church, in the Diocese of Southwell and Nottingham is a Grade I listed building and this was given by the Department for Digital, Culture, Media and Sport as a building of outstanding architectural and historical interest.

History
The church is medieval in origin. It was restored by George Gilbert Scott in 1845–1846, with further work done by W. D. Caroe in 1912.

Features
The lychgate installed in 1881 was designed by Frank Miles, son of Robert Miles, rector at the time.

Bells
There are currently eight bells in the tower. In 1922, the bells were augmented from a ring of six to a ring of eight with the two trebles being added. They are rung on Sunday for the service and also on special occasions. They are additionally rung on Fridays as part of a practice night for the Bell Ringers from 19:30 to 21:00.

The largest bell is called the tenor, which has a weight of 14.3 cwt. The smallest bell is called the treble, which has a weight of 4.3 cwt.

Organ
The organ was built by the London firm of Bryceson and Son and installed in 1859. It was officially opened on Thursday 15 September 1859.

Incumbents
Richard Wyot 1519–1522
John Stapleton
Robert Abbot, 1598–1615
John Hanmer, 1615–1624
Matthew Wren, 1624–1634
William Robinson, 1635–1642
Samuel Porter, 1643 onwards
Samuel Brunsell, 1662–1687
Henry Brunsell, 1687–1707
William Browne, 1708–1710
Henry Stanhope, 1711–1764
John Walter, 1764–1810
Robert Lowe, 1810–1845
Robert Henry William Miles, 1845–1883
Percy Howard Droosten, 1884–1906
Henry Robert Mackenzie Hutt 1910–1933
John Reay, 1933–1953
Morris Gelsthorpe, 1953–1963, previously Bishop of Sudan
Harold Arthur Kirton, 1963–1971
David Peter Keene, 1971–1981 
David Swain, 1982–1994
David Laurence Harper, 1994–2016.
Jon Wright, 2017 onwards

See also
Grade I listed buildings in Nottinghamshire
Listed buildings in Bingham, Nottinghamshire

Sources
The Buildings of England, Nottinghamshire. Nikolaus Pevsner

References

Grade I listed churches in Nottinghamshire
Church of England church buildings in Nottinghamshire